Cellana stellifera, common name the star limpet, is a species of true limpet, a marine gastropod mollusc in the family Nacellidae.

References

 Powell A. W. B., William Collins Publishers Ltd, Auckland 1979 

Nacellidae
Gastropods of New Zealand
Gastropods described in 1791
Taxa named by Johann Friedrich Gmelin